Mukomuko is a regency of Bengkulu Province, Indonesia, on the island of Sumatra.  It covers a land area of 4,146.52 km2 and had a population of 155,753 at the 2010 census, which rose to 190,498 at the 2020 census. The administrative centre of the Mukomuko Regency is Mukomuko town.

In the 18th and 19th Centuries, it was known to the British East India Company as "Moco Moco".

History 
The native of Mukomuko is Mukomuko people which is a tribe from the Minangkabau family. Traditionally, culturally, and language, Mukomuko is close to the Pesisir Selatan region in West Sumatra region.

In the past the Mukomuko area was part of the West Coast region (Pasisie Baraik) Minangkabau tribe. The Mukomuko tribe is a tribe that is closely related to the Minangkabau or the closest Minangkabau ethnic group. The Mukomuko area is also an overseas Minangkabau region which is often also called the Riak nan Berdebur namely the area along the West Coast from Padang to South Bengkulu.  However, since the British colonial period, the Mukomuko area has been included in the Bengkulu administration (Bencoolen). Since then they have been separated from their comrades in West Sumatra and become an integral part of the Bengkulu region. This continued during the Dutch colonial period, Japanese occupation, until the independence period.

During the independence period, the Mukomuko region was included in the Tk. II with the name North Bengkulu Regency. The division of regencies and cities has greeted almost all provinces in Indonesia, including Bengkulu Province. In early 2003, the province added three new regencies as stipulated by Law No.3 of 2003, namely North Bengkulu Regency was divided into North Bengkulu Regency and Mukomuko Regency. The South Bengkulu Regency was also divided into South Bengkulu, Seluma, and Kaur.

Similar to other districts in Bengkulu, Mukomuko was also affected by an earthquake, where on September 13, 2007, an earthquake devastated a part of the population of Mukomuko, especially in the Lubuk Pinang sub-district.

Sending transmigrants to Bengkulu has flared up again since 1967. In fact, Presidential Decree of the Republic of Indonesia Number 2 of 1973 stipulates Bengkulu Province and nine other provinces as transmigration areas outside Java. One of the transmigrant destinations is Bengkulu Utara and this policy continues to this day. In 2004 Bengkulu still received additional transmigrants. Each transmigrant family is provided with two hectares of land.  The majority of transmigrants from Java are farmers. Now these migrant population centers have grown into economic centers.

Population growth is very fast with this transmigration program. This has also caused a change in the composition of the population in the Mukomuko Regency area.  Currently, the number of immigrants from Java has far exceeded the number of natives of Mukomuko. So that in reality today, indigenous people are a minority in Mukomuko Regency.

Tourism 
Attractions in Mukomuko Regency include: Abrasion Beach (But Lauik), Beautiful Lotus Lake, Wide Lake, Nimbung Lake, Manjunto Air Dam, Fort Anna (Benteng Anna), Air Rami Beach, Pandan Wangi Beach, the dam which was inaugurated by President Soeharto is located in Kec.V Koto and no less interesting is Turtle conservation, located in the village of Retak Ilir, Ipuh District.

The local cultural heritage which includes the cultural splendor and history of the kingdom, can be explored for both domestic and foreign tourists to visit this city.  to continue to be preserved for the sake of the continuity of the legacy of the past and history.

Administrative Districts
Mukomuko Regency is divided into fifteen districts (kecamatan), listed below with their areas and their populations at the 2010 census and the 2020 census.

References

This article is based in part on material from the Indonesian Wikipedia.

Regencies of Bengkulu